Microlechia karsholti is a moth of the family Gelechiidae. It is found in Russia (the southern Ural). The habitat consists of chalk steppe.

The wingspan is 8–9.5 mm. The ground colour of the forewings is pure creamish white with a blackish brown pattern. The hindwings are whitish fuscous. Adults are on wing in June.

Etymology
The species is named in honour of Ole Karsholt.

References

Moths described in 2010
Microlechia